Bradley Scott Schneider (born August 20, 1961) is an American businessman and politician serving as the U.S. representative for Illinois's 10th congressional district since 2017 and from 2013 to 2015. The district includes many of Chicago's northern suburbs in the Chicago metropolitan area. Its most populous city is Waukegan, an industrial suburb on Lake Michigan.

Before he was elected to Congress, Schneider worked as a management consultant and industrial engineer in Deerfield, Illinois. A member of the Democratic Party, Schneider was first elected in 2012, narrowly defeating Republican incumbent Bob Dold. In 2014, he lost his bid for reelection to Dold. He defeated Dold two years later in their third consecutive matchup. He has since been reelected three times by large margins.

Early life, education and career
Schneider was born on August 20, 1961, in Denver, Colorado, where he graduated from Cherry Creek High School. In 1983, after receiving a Bachelor of Science in industrial engineering from Northwestern University, Schneider worked on a kibbutz in Israel. He later returned to the Chicago area to receive a Master of Business Administration from Northwestern's Kellogg Graduate School of Management in 1988, and worked for the consulting firm PriceWaterhouseCoopers.

Schneider worked as the managing principal of the life insurance firm Davis Dann Adler Schneider, LLC, from 1997 until 2003, when he became the director of the strategic services group at Blackman Kallick. In 2008, he started his own consulting company, Cadence Consulting Group.

U.S House of Representatives

Elections

2012

Schneider defeated Ilya Sheyman, John Tree, and Vivek Bavda in the Democratic primary election on March 20, 2012, with 47% of the vote. He faced incumbent Republican Robert Dold in the November 6 general election. The nonpartisan Rothenberg Political Report declared the 10th district election "Leans Democrat" while Roll Call categorized the race as a toss-up. The Democratic Congressional Campaign Committee placed significant focus on the race as part of their Red to Blue Program. Schneider defeated Dold by 3,326 votes, 51%-49%.

2014

Schneider ran for reelection. Dold was again the Republican nominee. As of July 2014, Schneider's campaign had $1.9 million cash on hand and Dold's $1.65 million. Schneider was a member of the Democratic Congressional Campaign Committee's Frontline program, a program designed to protect the most vulnerable Democratic incumbents.

Schneider was endorsed by the League of Conservation Voters and Planned Parenthood.

Dold won the election.

2016

In March 2016, Schneider won the Democratic nomination for the 10th district seat, defeating Nancy Rotering, the mayor of Highland Park. Dold ran for reelection. Schneider defeated Dold by 13,916 votes, 52%-48%.

2018

Schneider ran for reelection. He was unopposed in the Democratic primary election. Dold did not run again; business consultant Douglas Bennett narrowly won the Republican nomination against doctor Sapan Shah and attorney Jeremy Wynes. Parting ways with the district's reputation as a swing district, that year it was considered "Solid Democrat." Schneider was reelected.

Tenure
Schneider campaigned as a moderate Democrat, and often described himself as a progressive. He has described himself as "pragmatic and a moderate."

Abortion 
Schneider has said he is "100 percent pro-choice", and has been endorsed by Planned Parenthood and NARAL Pro-Choice America. He co-sponsored a bill to reverse the impact of the Supreme Court's ruling in Burwell v. Hobby Lobby  and require employers to offer "a full range" of contraceptive options.

Environment 
Schneider supports EPA carbon emission standards for power plants. In his 2012 primary race, he supported emissions trading, incentives for businesses to develop alternative energy systems, and tax credits for individuals to implement sustainable and renewable energy improvements in their homes.

Foreign policy 
Schneider supports "broad and deep" sanctions on Iran and covert operations to dissuade Iran from its nuclear weapons program, as well as its sales to terrorist organizations. He is a longtime member of AIPAC.

In February 2023, Schneider signed a letter advocating for President Biden to give F-16 fighter jets to Ukraine.

Guns
In March 2021, Schneider and Representative Adriano Espaillat proposed legislation to close the ghost guns loophole in an effort to curb gun violence.

Health care
Schneider supports the Patient Protection and Affordable Care Act signed into law by President Obama, and opposes repeal. He voted for a bill to increase enrollment transparency.

LGBT issues
Schneider supports same-sex marriage.

Tax policy
Schneider told the Chicago Tribune that he favors a 3:1 ratio of spending cuts to tax increases in order to reduce the debt. He said he is open to cuts in discretionary, defense, and entitlement spending. Schneider supported the repeal of the Bush tax cuts and "long-term, comprehensive tax reform" that includes higher taxes on high incomes.

Privacy
Schneider voted against the Amash–Conyers Amendment, a bill "that would have stopped the surveillance programs of the NSA".

Minimum wage
Schneider co-sponsored a bill that would raise the minimum wage to $10.10 an hour.

Committee assignments
Committee on Ways and Means
Subcommittee on Health
Subcommittee on Social Security
Committee on Foreign Affairs
Subcommittee on Europe, Energy, the Environment and Cyber 
Subcommittee on the Middle East, North Africa and Global Counterterrorism

Caucus memberships
New Democrat Coalition
Blue Dog Coalition
Problem Solvers Caucus

Electoral history

Personal life 
Schneider and his wife Julie live in Deerfield. They have two sons.

In 2013, Roll Call reported that Schneider was the 35th-wealthiest member of Congress. He ranked as the 34th-wealthiest member of Congress in 2014. In 2012, the Chicago Tribune noted that Schneider billed himself as a small businessman, though "he has taken on few paying ventures in recent years".

In 2013, Schneider led a JUF mission of 25 people to Israel. He has also been involved with AIPAC and the Jewish Federation of Metropolitan Chicago.

In 2014, Schneider changed his filing status in a manner to prevent having to disclose his wife's income.

Schneider tested positive for COVID-19 on January 12, 2021, after sheltering in place during the U.S. Capitol attack.

Schneider and his staffers were planning to march at an Independence Day parade in Highland Park when a mass shooting occurred there. All of them survived unharmed.

See also
 List of Jewish members of the United States Congress

References

External links

 Congressman Brad Schneider official U.S. House website
 Campaign website

 

|-

1961 births
21st-century American politicians
Democratic Party members of the United States House of Representatives from Illinois
Jewish members of the United States House of Representatives
Kellogg School of Management alumni
Living people
People from Deerfield, Illinois
Politicians from Denver
Robert R. McCormick School of Engineering and Applied Science alumni
21st-century American Jews
American Jews from Illinois